The Australian Music Prize (often shortened to the AMP) is an annual award of $30,000 given to an Australian band or solo artist in recognition of the merit of an album released during the year of award. The award was made by Australian Music Prize Ltd, a sole-purpose entity sponsored by a variety of music industry figures and record companies. The AMP was established in 2005.

Unlike the more mainstream ARIA Music Awards, the AMP aims to encourage Australian music of excellence – the prize's stated aim is to "financially reward and increase exposure for an Australian artist (or group of artists) who have produced and commercially released what specially appointed judges vote is the best contemporary music album in any one calendar year". In this sense, the AMP is broadly comparable to the UK's Mercury Music Prize.

The prize typically launches at the start of October each year and accepts entries (must be new Australian artist albums commercially released in that year) in October and November. A shortlist is announced the following February and then a winner at an event in Sydney in March.

Past winners and short list nominees

See also
 Choice Music Prize (Ireland)
 Mercury Prize (United Kingdom)
 Nordic Music Prize (Nordic countries)
 Polaris Music Prize (Canada)
 Prix Constantin (France)
 Shortlist Music Prize (United States)

References

External links

Australian music awards
Music competitions in Australia
2005 establishments in Australia
Awards established in 2005